Robert Sterling Hand is an American astrologer, historian, and writer.

Early life
Robert Hand was born in Plainfield, New Jersey, and grew up in Orleans, Massachusetts. He began studying astrology at the age of 17. His father, Wilfred Hand, was a specialist in cosmobiology and heliocentric astrology, and used astrological charts to forecast changes in the stock market, and taught his son the basics of casting astrological charts.  Hand went to Brandeis University, where he earned a B.A. in Intellectual History in 1965. He then went on to Princeton University and left before receiving a degree to pursue astrology as a full-time profession in 1972.

Career
Hand began writing programs for microcomputers in 1977 with a desire to bring the benefits of fast and accurate calculations to the practice of astrology. Out of this effort, he founded Astro-Graphics Services in 1980 which later become Astrolabe, Inc.

Hand founded Arhat Media in 1997. Arhat, which is an acronym for "Archive for the Retrieval of Historical Astrological Texts",  procures, protects and publishes translations of historical astrological works and secondary source material for serious astrologers and scholars.  Some of this material has been integrated into the Robert Hand Library, which now houses the original texts and translations of most of the ancient and medieval astrologers, as well as the history of science, philosophy and mystical Judaism.

Hand gives chart readings and consultations in Reston, Virginia, and Las Vegas, Nevada.

Works

Books
 
 
 
 
 

Contributions

Interviews and lectures
 Transcript of a talk Hand presented at the Astrological Conference 2005 of the British Astrological Association in York, UK.

References

External links

1942 births
Living people
20th-century astrologers
21st-century astrologers
American astrologers
American astrological writers
American male non-fiction writers
American spiritual writers
Brandeis University alumni
Catholic University of America alumni
New Age writers